Elton da Costa Jr. (born 15 December 1979) is a Brazilian footballer currently playing for German amateur club FC 07 Bensheim.

2013-14 2.Bundesliga play-off
The 2.Bundesliga Playoff's second leg between Arminia Bielefeld and SV Darmstadt 98 is what Elton da Costa is best known for. In the 120+2nd minute (the last minute of the game) he scored the goal to send Darmstadt to the 2nd Bundesliga.

References

External links
 

1979 births
Living people
Brazilian footballers
SV Darmstadt 98 players
SpVgg Unterhaching players
FC Augsburg players
FSV Frankfurt players
Kickers Offenbach players
2. Bundesliga players
3. Liga players
Expatriate footballers in Germany
Association football midfielders